Jack Brewer (21 October 1914 – 16 July 1993) was a British athlete. He competed in the men's discus throw at the 1948 Summer Olympics.

References

1914 births
1993 deaths
Athletes (track and field) at the 1948 Summer Olympics
British male discus throwers
Olympic athletes of Great Britain
Place of birth missing